Saint-Médard-d'Eyrans (Gascon: Sent Medard d'Airans) is a commune in the Gironde department in Nouvelle-Aquitaine in southwestern France. Saint-Médard-d'Eyrans station has rail connections to Langon and Bordeaux.

Population

See also
Communes of the Gironde department
 Pessac-Léognan
 Communes of the Gironde department

References

Communes of Gironde